L'information grammaticale is an academic journal which publishes articles and book reviews on French linguistics. Different aspects of the French language are studied. It was founded in 1979 by Guy Serbat (1918-2001), emeritus professor at the Paris-Sorbonne University and is published by Peeters Publishers in Leuven, Belgium.

Published quarterly, the journal is focused mainly on the usage of certain vocabulary within literary works. What does an author mean with a certain phrase or word? How is it used by others and how was it used historically?

External links
 
 Publisher's website
 Online access 
 Free access to back issues: pre-2004

French-language journals
Publications established in 1979
Linguistics journals
Peeters Publishers academic journals